The Executive Council of Ontario, often informally referred to as the Cabinet of Ontario, is the cabinet of the Canadian province of Ontario. It comprises ministers of the provincial Crown, who are selected by the premier of Ontario (the first minister of the Crown) and appointed by the lieutenant governor. The activities of the Government of Ontario are directed by the Executive Council.

The Executive Council is almost always made up of members of the Legislative Assembly of Ontario. Though the lieutenant governor does not generally attend Cabinet meetings, directives issued by the Crown on the advice of the ministers are said to be ordered by the Lieutenant Governor-in-Council. Ministers hold the honorific prefix "The Honourable" while members of the council.

The Cabinet is similar in structure and role to the federal Privy Council for Canada, though smaller in size, and, whereas the federal Cabinet is actually a committee of the Privy Council, the Executive Council of Ontario and Cabinet of Ontario are one and the same. Also, unlike the Privy Council, members of the Ontario Executive Council are not appointed for life, and are not entitled to post-nominal letters.

Current Cabinet

Doug Ford and his Cabinet were sworn in by Lieutenant Governor Elizabeth Dowdeswell on June 29, 2018, following the 2018 general election. This is the current cabinet of Ontario:

Lieutenant Governor 

Premier

Other ministers

Former portfolios
 Ministry of Children's Services (2003–2004)
 Ministry of Citizenship and Culture (1983–1987)
 Ministry of Citizenship (1987–1995; 2001–2003)
 Ministry of Citizenship, Culture and Recreation (1995–2001)
 Ministry of Citizenship and Immigration (2016-2018)
 Ministry of Citizenship, Immigration and International Trade (2003–2016)
 Ministry of Colleges and Universities (1972–1993)
 Ministry of Community, Family and Children's Services (2002–2003)
 Ministry of Community Safety and Correctional Services (2003-2019)
 Ministry of Consumer and Business Services (2003–2005)
 Ministry of Consumer and Commercial Relations (1972–2001)
 Ministry of Correctional Services (1972–1993; 1999–2002)
 Ministry of Culture and Communications (1987–1993)
 Ministry of Culture, Tourism and Recreation (1993–1995)
 Ministry of Economic Development, Trade and Tourism (1995–1999; 2008–2011)
 Ministry of Economic Development and Trade (1999−2008)
 Ministry of Education and Training (1993–1999)
 Ministry of Energy and Infrastructure (2007–2010)
 Ministry of Energy, Science and Technology (1997–2002)
 Ministry of Enterprise, Opportunity and Innovation (2002–2003)
 Ministry of Environment and Energy (1993–1997; 2002)
 Ministry of Financial Institutions (1986–1993)
 Ministry of Health (1972–1999)
 Ministry of Housing (1973–1981; 1985–1995)
 Ministry of Industry, Trade and Technology (1985–1993)
 International Trade
 Ministry of Municipal Affairs (1985–1995; 2003–2004)
 Ministry of Public Infrastructure Renewal (2005−2008)
 Ministry of Public Safety and Security (2002–2003)
 Ministry of Research, Innovation and Science (2013–2018)
 Ministry of Revenue (1968–2012)
 Ministry of Skills Development (1985–1993)
 Ministry of the Solicitor General (1972–1993; 1999–2002)
 Ministry of the Solicitor General and Correctional Services (1993–1999)
 Ministry of Tourism (1999–2001)
 Ministry of Tourism, Culture and Recreation (2001–2002)
 Ministry of Transportation and Communications (1971–1987)
 Ministry of Treasury and Economics (1978–1993)
 Provincial Secretary and Registrar of Ontario (from 1961 Provincial Secretary and Minister of Citizenship) (list) (1867–1975)

Ontario Shadow Cabinet
 Official Opposition Shadow Cabinet of the 42nd Legislative Assembly of Ontario

See also
 Order of precedence in Ontario

References

External links
 Cabinet of Ontario